Victor Wilfrid Jopp (June 25, 1887 – June 25, 1965) was a Canadian professional ice hockey player. He played with the Toronto Blueshirts of the National Hockey Association, appearing in one game for the Blueshirts in the 1912–13 season. That same season included stints with the Halifax Crescents and Sydney Millionaires. He played in Halifax once again in 1913–14. He previously played in the Saskatchewan Senior Hockey League with Moosomin, his hometown from around 1906 to 1910.

References

External links
Victor Jopp at JustSportsStats

1887 births
1965 deaths
Canadian ice hockey forwards
People from Moosomin, Saskatchewan
Ice hockey people from Saskatchewan
Toronto Blueshirts players